Matteo Calcagno (born 4 February 2000) is an Italian footballer who plays as a defender for Serie D side Ligorna.

Club career
Calcagno started his career in Genoa, on the summer of 2017, he was loaned to Serie D side Albissola to the 2017–18. The team promoted to Serie C, they made Gulli's signing permanent on the summer of 2018. He made his professional debut in the 6th round of 2018–19 season, playing 90 minutes in the 1–1 home won against Piacenza.

On 16 July 2019, he signed with Virtus Francavilla. On 31 January 2020, he was loaned to Arzignano until the end of the 2019–20 season.

On 18 August 2021, he signed with Ancona-Matelica in Serie C. Just two weeks later, his contract was terminated by mutual consent for family reasons.

On 18 September 2021, he joined Serie D club Ligorna.

References

Sources
 
 

2000 births
Living people
Footballers from Genoa
Association football defenders
Italian footballers
Serie C players
Serie D players
Genoa C.F.C. players
Albissola 2010 players
Virtus Francavilla Calcio players
Ancona-Matelica players